Scrobipalpa heretica is a moth of the family Gelechiidae. It is in southern China (Xinjiang), Russia (the southern Ural, Volga region), Turkey, Iran, Afghanistan, Kazakhstan and the Altai.

There are mixed light and dark ash-grey scales with black tips on the forewings. The hindwings are dark ash-grey.

References

Moths described in 1973
Scrobipalpa
Insects of Turkey